Gavin Cronje (born 21 April 1979 in Johannesburg) is a South African racing driver. He has competed in such series as Euroseries 3000 and the Formula Renault 3.5 Series. He won the inaugural Formula Volkswagen South Africa Championship in 2008 with Morgado Racing. He was runner-up in the 2009 Formula Le Mans Cup season to DAMS teammate Nico Verdonck.

References

External links
 Official website
 Career statistics from Driver Database

1979 births
Living people
Sportspeople from Johannesburg
South African racing drivers
Formula Ford drivers
Auto GP drivers
A1 Grand Prix Rookie drivers
World Series Formula V8 3.5 drivers
Carlin racing drivers

DAMS drivers